Stephen Robert Hartman (born April 14, 1963) is an American broadcast journalist. Hartman earned a degree in broadcast journalism at Bowling Green State University, graduating in 1985.  Hartman lives with his wife, Andrea, and their three children in Catskill, New York. One of his children has autism. Hartman is an Eagle Scout.

Career 
From 1984–87, he served as an intern and general assignment reporter for WTOL in Toledo, Ohio. From 1987 to 1991, he was a feature reporter for KSTP in Minneapolis and held the same post at WABC-TV in New York City from 1991–94. From 1994 to 1998, he served as a feature reporter for KCBS-TV in Los Angeles, and hosted a segment called "The Stevening News". Hartman was also a correspondent for two CBS News magazines, Coast to Coast (1996–97) and Public Eye with Bryant Gumbel (1997–98). In 1998, Hartman became a full-time CBS News correspondent; he served as 60 Minutes II essayist from 2002 until the show was canceled in September 2005.

Everybody Has a Story 
Hartman became well known for his award-winning feature series, Everybody Has a Story. Hartman got the idea from newspaper reporter David Johnson of the Lewiston [Idaho] Morning Tribune. He first tried a few stories on Public Eye. Hartman would toss a dart over his shoulder at a map of the United States, and then travel to wherever the dart landed. Upon arrival, Hartman would find a phonebook, and choosing a name at random, would try to find a person who would agree to be interviewed and tell their "story". Hartman traveled around the country, from Hawaii to Alaska, from Buckhannon, West Virginia, to Miami, Florida. From its inception in 1998, the series produced 123 stories.

In 2010, Hartman took the series worldwide, when with assistance of NASA, each "Everybody in the World Has a Story" segment featured an astronaut in the International Space Station spinning a globe and pointing to random locations for Hartman to travel and find a story.

On the Road 
Hartman's "Assignment America" reports were part of the CBS Evening News with Katie Couric; they were inspired by Charles Kuralt's On the Road series, which originally aired on CBS from 1967 to 1980. In 2011, CBS revived On the Road, with Hartman providing the Friday evening end-pieces for the CBS Evening News with Scott Pelley. The series won two 2013 Edward R. Murrow Awards (presented by the Radio Television Digital News Association) for the CBS Evening News. Three of Hartman's stories won in the Best Writing category.

Kindness 101 
Steve Hartman has been featuring Kindness 101, inspiring stories about goodness, kindness, compassion, appearing on CBS Evening News.

Awards 
In 2002 Hartman received an Alfred I. DuPont-Columbia University Award from the Columbia Journalism School, for the Everybody has a Story series.

He has received four Edward R. Murrow Awards from the Radio Television Digital News Association (RTDNA), including three consecutive citations for Best Writing. In 2011 he was awarded an Emmy for Outstanding Feature Story in a Newscast, from the Academy of Television Arts and Sciences.

References

External links 

American television reporters and correspondents
Bowling Green State University alumni
Emmy Award winners
1963 births
Living people
CBS News people